The 2000 PPP Healthcare County Championship was the 101st officially organised running of the Championship. Surrey won Division One with Northamptonshire winning the second division.

It was the first time that the championship was held with two divisions with a promotion and relegation format in place.

Tables
12 points for a win
4 points for a draw
Batting 200 runs, 1 point, 250 runs, 2 points, 300 runs, 3 points, 350 runs, 4 points, 400 runs, 5 points. 
Bowling 3 wickets, 1 point, six wickets, 2 points, nine wickets, 3 points.

Division One

 8 points deducted

Division Two

References

2000 in English cricket
County Championship seasons